Terena Sign Language is a village sign language used by deaf Terena people in southern Brazil. Deaf Terena who attend school use LIBRAS there, but switch to Terena Sign when they return home.

See also
Terena language

References

Village sign languages
Sign languages of Brazil